This is a list of power stations in Saskatchewan, Canada.

In 2018, the total installed capacity of generation was 4,531 MW with 40% from natural gas, 34% from coal, 20% from hydro, 5% from wind, and 1% from other sources such as solar.

Owned by SaskPower

Owned by Non-Crown Corporations

References

See also 
 SaskPower
 Energy in Canada
 List of power stations in Canada
 Coal mining in Saskatchewan

Lists of power stations in Canada